Glischrochilus quadripunctatus, commonly known as the European bark beetle predator is a species of beetle in the genus Glischrochilus of the family Nitidulidae.

Description
The species is approximately 4–6 mm in length and is a uniform dark colouration on its head, thorax and abdomen. It has four prominent orange blotches on the elytra. The body of G. quadripunctatus is smooth and shiny and the rear edge of the thorax is narrower than the elytra.

It is very similar in appearance to Glischrochilus hortensis.

Distribution
It is one of the three species of Glischrochilus found in the United Kingdom and has a wide distribution in England, Wales, and Scotland.

Habitat
It is active all-year round, but most often found in the months March to November around conifers.

References

External links
 Photographic comparison of Glischrochilus quadripunctatus with other Glischrochilus species.
 Bibliography for quadripunctatus at Biodiversity Heritage Library

Beetles described in 1758
Beetles of Europe
Nitidulidae
Taxa named by Carl Linnaeus